The province of the West Sumatra in Indonesia is divided into kabupaten or regencies which in turn are divided administratively into districts or kecamatan. Specially for all West Sumatra districts (kecamatan) with the exception of Mentawai Islands, they are further divided to nagari, each is headed by a wali nagari. According to data from BPS as of 2020, there are 850 nagari.

Districts

The districts of West Sumatra with the regency it falls into are as follows:

2 X 11 Kayu Tanam, Padang Pariaman
Akabiluru, Lima Puluh Kota
Alam Pauh Duo, Solok Selatan
Ampek Nagari, Agam
Aur Birugo Tigo Baleh, Bukittinggi
Banuhampu, Agam
Barangin, Sawahlunto
Basa IV Balai Tapan, Pesisir Selatan
Baso, Agam
Batang Anai, Padang Pariaman
Batang Gasan, Padang Pariaman
Batang Kapas, Pesisir Selatan
Batipuh Selatan, Tanah Datar
Batipuh, Tanah Datar
Bayang Utara, Pesisir Selatan
Bayang, Pesisir Selatan
Bukit Barisan, Lima Puluh Kota
Bukit Sundi, Solok
Bungus Teluk Kabung, Padang
Candung, Agam
Danau Kembar, Solok
Guguk Panjang, Bukittinggi
Guguk, Lima Puluh Kota
Gunung Mas, Lima Puluh Kota
Gunung Talang, Solok
Gunung Tuleh, Pasaman Barat
Harau, Lima Puluh Kota
Hiliran Gumanti, Solok
II Koto, Pasaman
II.X.XI.VI Lingkung, Padang Pariaman
III Nagari, Pasaman
IV Angkat Canduang, Agam
IV Jurai, Pesisir Selatan
IV Koto Aur Malintang, Padang Pariaman
IV Koto, Agam
IV Nagari, Sawahlunto Sijunjung
IV Nagari, Sijunjung
IX Koto Sungai Lasi, Solok
Junjung Sirih, Solok
Kamang Baru, Sawahlunto Sijunjung
Kamang Baru, Sijunjung
Kamang Magek, Agam
Kapur IX, Lima Puluh Kota
Kinali, Pasaman Barat
Koto Baru, Dharmasraya
Koto Parik Gadang Diateh, Solok Selatan
Koto Tangah, Padang
Koto Tujuh, Sawahlunto Sijunjung
Koto Tujuh, Sijunjung
Koto XI Tarusan, Pesisir Selatan
Kubung, Solok
Kupitan, Sawahlunto Sijunjung
Kupitan, Sijunjung
Kuranji, Padang
Lareh Sago Halaban, Lima Puluh Kota
Lembah Gumanti, Solok
Lembah Melintang, Pasaman Barat
Lembah Segar, Sawahlunto
Lembang Jaya, Solok
Lengayang, Pesisir Selatan
Lima Kaum, Tanah Datar
Linggo Sari Baganti, Pesisir Selatan
Lintau Buo Utara, Tanah Datar
Lintau Buo, Tanah Datar
Lubuk Alung, Padang Pariaman
Lubuk Basung, Agam
Lubuk Begalung, Padang
Lubuk Kilangan, Padang
Lubuk Sikaping, Pasaman
Lubuk Sikarah, Solok
Lubuk Tarok, Sawahlunto Sijunjung
Lubuk Tarok, Sijunjung
Luhak Nan Duo, Pasaman Barat
Luhak, Lima Puluh Kota
Lunang Silaut, Pesisir Selatan
Mandiangin Koto Selayan, Bukittinggi
Mapat Tunggul Selatan, Pasaman
Mapat Tunggul, Pasaman
Matur, Agam
Mungka, Lima Puluh Kota
Nan Sabaris, Padang Pariaman
Nanggalo, Padang
Padang Barat, Padang
Padang Ganting, Tanah Datar
Padang Panjang Barat, Padang Panjang
Padang Panjang Timur, Padang Panjang
Padang Sago, Padang Pariaman
Padang Selatan, Padang
Padang Timur, Padang
Padang Utara, Padang
Pagai Selatan, Kepulauan Mentawai
Pagai Utara, Kepulauan Mentawai
Palembayan, Agam
Palupuh, Agam
Pancung Soal, Pesisir Selatan
Pangkalan Koto Baru, Lima Puluh Kota
Pantai Cermin, Solok
Panti, Pasaman
Pariaman Selatan, Pariaman
Pariaman Tengah, Pariaman
Pariaman Utara, Pariaman
Pariangan, Tanah Datar
Pasaman, Pasaman Barat
Patamuan, Padang Pariaman
Pauh, Padang
Payakumbuh Barat, Payakumbuh
Payakumbuh Timur, Payakumbuh
Payakumbuh Utara, Payakumbuh
Payakumbuh, Lima Puluh Kota
Payung Sekaki, Solok
Pulau Punjung, Dharmasraya
Rambatan, Tanah Datar
Ranah Balingka, Pasaman Barat
Ranah Batahan, Pasaman Barat
Ranah Pesisir, Pesisir Selatan
Rao, Pasaman
Salimpaung, Tanah Datar
Sangir Balai Janggo, Solok Selatan
Sangir Batanghari, Solok Selatan
Sangir Jujuan, Solok Selatan
Sangir, Solok Selatan
Sasak Ranah Pesisir, Pasaman Barat
Sepuluh Koto, Tanah Datar
Siberut Selatan, Kepulauan Mentawai
Siberut Utara, Kepulauan Mentawai
Sijunjung, Sawahlunto Sijunjung
Sijunjung, Sijunjung
Silungkang, Sawahlunto
Sipora, Kepulauan Mentawai
Sitiung, Dharmasraya
Situjuh Lima Nagari, Lima Puluh Kota
Suliki Gunung Mas, Lima Puluh Kota
Sumpur Kudus, Sawahlunto Sijunjung
Sumpur Kudus, Sijunjung
Sungai Aur, Pasaman Barat
Sungai Beremas, Pasaman Barat
Sungai Geringging, Padang Pariaman
Sungai Limau, Padang Pariaman
Sungai Pagu, Solok Selatan
Sungai Puar, Agam
Sungai Rumbai, Dharmasraya
Sungai Tarab, Tanah Datar
Sungayang, Tanah Datar
Sutera, Pesisir Selatan
Talamau, Pasaman Barat
Talawi, Sawahlunto
Tanjung Baru, Tanah Datar
Tanjung Emas, Tanah Datar
Tanjung Gadang, Sawahlunto Sijunjung
Tanjung Gadang, Sijunjung
Tanjung Harapan, Solok
Tanjung Mutiara, Agam
Tanjung Raya, Agam
Tigo Lurah, Solok
Tilatang Kamang, Agam
Ulakan Tapakis, Padang Pariaman
V Koto Kp Dalam, Padang Pariaman
V Koto Timur, Padang Pariaman
VI Lingkung, Padang Pariaman
VII Koto Sungai Sarik, Padang Pariaman
X Koto Diatas, Solok
X Koto Singkarak, Solok

Nagari

References

 
West Sumatra